Secret Lake is a meltwater lake  west of Ares Cliff, near the east coast of Alexander Island in Antarctica.

Description
The lake is situated in a north-west facing glacial cirque and is fed from an area of stagnant ice. The lake was first mapped by Directorate of Overseas Surveys from satellite imagery supplied by the United States National Aeronautics and Space Administration in cooperation with the United States Geological Survey. The name by United Kingdom Antarctic Place-Names Committee refers to the secluded and isolated location of the lake.

See also
 Ablation Lake
 Lake Hodgson
 Moutonnee Lake

References

Lakes of Antarctica
Bodies of water of Alexander Island